William Henry Fortescue, 1st Earl of Clermont, KP (5 August 1722 – 30 September 1806), was an Irish peer and politician.

Origins
He was the eldest son of Thomas Fortescue (1683–1769), a Member of Parliament for Dundalk. His younger brother was James Fortescue, MP and Privy Counsellor.

Career
He served as High Sheriff of Louth in 1746. He represented Louth in the Irish House of Commons from 1745 to 1760 and subsequently Monaghan Borough from 1761 to 1770. In 1768 he sat briefly as Member of Parliament for Dundalk before opting to sit for Monaghan Borough, for which he had also been elected. He was appointed Governor and Custos Rotulorum of County Monaghan for life in 1775, standing down just before his death in 1806. He was created Earl of Clermont in 1777 and a Knight Founder of the Order of St Patrick on 30 March 1795. He was a francophile and it is believed on that account he selected Clermont as the name of his earldom.

He had horseracing interests and his racing silks were all crimson. He was known in racing circles as the Father of the Turf and won the Derby with his horse Aimwell.

He had a country estate in Norfolk and his London townhouse was 44 Berkeley Square in Mayfair, which he purchased after the death of its builder, Lady Isabella Finch (1700–1771), the 7th daughter of Daniel Finch, 7th Earl of Winchilsea, 2nd Earl of Nottingham. In the early 1960s it became the home of the Clermont Club, an exclusive gambling club, and its basement and garden were occupied until 2018 by the then exclusive nightclub Annabel's.

Marriage and progeny
He married Frances Cairnes Murray, a daughter and co-heiress of Colonel John Murray, MP for County Monaghan, by whom he had an only daughter:
Louisa Fortescue.

Death, burial and succession
He died aged 85 at Brighton on 29 September 1806, without male progeny, and was buried at Little Cressingham Church in Norfolk, in which parish was situated  Clermont Lodge (now Clermont Hall), his shooting lodge. 
As he died without male progeny his earldom of Clermont and 1770 barony of Clermont became extinct, whilst his viscountcy and 1776 barony of Clermont were inherited by his nephew William Charles Fortescue, who had been MP for Louth and then County Louth since 1796.

Monument in St Andrew's Church, Little Cressingham

A mural monument survives in St Andrew's Church, Little Cressingham, inscribed as follows:
Near this place lyeth the body of William Henry Fortescue Viscount Clermont, and Earl of Clermont in Ireland, who departed this life on the 29th day of September, 1806, in the 85th year of his age. This monument is erected in obedience to his will by his executor William Charles Fortescue, now Viscount Clermont, who was in Ireland at the time of his decease.

References

|-

|-
|-

|-

1722 births
1806 deaths
Earls in the Peerage of Ireland
William
Fortescue, William
Fortescue, William
Fortescue, William
Knights of St Patrick
Owners of Epsom Derby winners
High Sheriffs of County Louth
Members of the Privy Council of Ireland
Fortescue, William
Fortescue, William
William
Peers of Ireland created by George III